History of diplomatic relations of Hungary and Serbia dates back to 21 November 1882, when they were established between Serbia and Austria-Hungary.  Today, Hungary has an embassy in Belgrade and a general consulate in Subotica, while Serbia has an embassy in Budapest and an honorary consulate in Szeged.

The two countries share 151 km of common border. There are around 254,000 people of Hungarian descent according to the latest census living in northern Serbia (particularly in Vojvodina) and around 7,000 people of traditional Serbian descent living in Hungary (not counting migrants from Serbia to Hungary since the 1990s).

History

Hungary and Serbia share a long historical contact, but both have been characterized between cooperation and conflict. Hungarian and Serbian refugees fled from Ottoman occupations, and used to be part of the famous Winged Hussars, a military regiment of the previous Polish–Lithuanian Commonwealth. However, relationship between two states turned tense in the later half of the 19th century, with the establishment of the Kingdom of Serbia and Serbian interests toward Bosnia and Herzegovina and Vojvodina, both have significant Serbian population. As part of Austria-Hungary, the Hungarian army formed a significant part of the invading army on Serbia at the World War I. After the war, Hungary lost Vojvodina, a former territory of the Kingdom of Hungary, to Serbia.

Hungary signed a non-aggression and "Treaty of Eternal Friendship" with Yugoslavia on 12 December 1940. However, Hungary participated in the Axis invasion on Yugoslavia which prompted the then Prime Minister of Hungary Pál Teleki to commit suicide. In the communist era, Yugoslavia's Josip Broz Tito was against the Hungarian Revolution of 1956 and supportive of Soviet military uses against Hungarians; but the suppression of Hungarian protesters by Soviet army might have influenced Tito's decision to change against the Soviets at the Prague Spring a decade later.

The relationship between Serbia and Hungary went downhill in the 1990s, when Yugoslavia started to disintegrate. Hungary was one of the earliest supporters of newly independent Croatia, and was among the major participants in the NATO-led bombing of Yugoslavia in 1999. This strained relations between the two countries, with Hungary also sharing concerns over its Hungarian population in Yugoslavia. Later, the relations continued to worsen, with Hungary being one of the earliest nations in the world to recognize Kosovo as an independent state.

In 2013, a historical reconciliation was marked after decades of tensions between Belgrade and Budapest. The President of Hungary, János Áder gave a speech in front of the National Assembly where he issued an official apology for the Hungarian role in the World War II persecution of Serbs such as Novi Sad raid. In turn, in 2014 the Serbian National Assembly symbolically voided Yugoslav laws on collective guilt of Hungarian people for crimes committed during World War II.

Neither Hungary nor Serbia have joined the sanctions against Russia following the 2022 Russian invasion of Ukraine, with the exception of those Hungary had to adopt as a member of the European Union. Both countries have been vocally against restricting Russian gas imports, and as a consequence have also suffered a deterioration in relations with Ukraine. On the other hand, because of their common stance, relations between the two countries have become warmer.

Serbian heritage in Hungary

The presence of Serbs in the territory of present-day Hungary dates from the Middle Ages. The mother of the Hungarian king Géza II (1141-1162) was Helena of Serbia, a daughter of Uroš I, ruler of the Grand Principality of Serbia,. During the rule of Géza II, her brother Beloš Vukanović was a palatine of the Kingdom of Hungary. Since the 14th century, escaping from the Ottoman threat, a large number of Serbs migrated to the Kingdom of Hungary.

The most complex example of Serb architectural heritage in Hungary is the old town of Szentendre (Serbian: Sentandreja), next to the Danube, with 7 Orthodox Churches (two of which have been sold), brightly coloured merchant houses and the Museum of Serb Orthodox Heritage. In Budapest, the Serb Orthodox Cathedral in the Tabán district was damaged in WWII and later demolished. There is an old Serb Orthodox Church in Serb Street, Pest and the famous Serb college, Thökölyanum (Serbian: Tekelijanum).

There are Serbian churches in Vác (Vac), Székesfehérvár (Stoni Beograd) with a Serbian open-air village museum, Szeged (Segedin), Baja (Baja) with two churches, Mohács (Mohač), Siklós (Šikloš), Eger (Jegra), Győr (Đur), Esztergom (Ostrogon), Hódmezővásárhely (Vašarhelj).

There are also village churches in Pomáz (Pomaz), Csobánka (Čobanac), Izbég, Ráckeve (Srpski Kovin, rare example of Serb Gothic architecture from the 15th century), Lórév (Lovra), Szigetcsép (Čip), Budakalász (Kalaz), Magyarcsanád (Čanad), Battonya (Batanja), Deszk (Deska), Szőreg (Sirig), Dunapentele (Pantelija, now Dunaújváros), Százhalombatta (Bata), Dunaföldvár (Feldvar), Alsónána (Donja Nana), Bátaszék (Batsek, demolished in the 1960s), Medina (Medina), Illocska (Iločac), Magyarbóly (Madžarboja), Dunaszekcső (Sečuj), Villány (Viljan), Sárok (Šarok), Majs (Majš), Lippó (Lipova), Beremend (Breme), Erdősmecske (Racmečka), Somberek (Šumberak), Véménd (Vemend, demolished), Nagybudmér (Veliki Budmir, demolished in 2001), Hercegszántó (Santovo), Újszentiván (Novi Sentivan).

There are two Serbian Orthodox Monasteries, one in Ráckeve (Srpski Kovin) and one in Grábóc (Grabovac).

Hungarian heritage in Serbia

Parts of the Vojvodina region were included into the medieval Kingdom of Hungary in the 10th century, and Hungarians then began to settle in the region, which before that time was mostly populated by Slavs. During Hungarian administration, Hungarians formed the largest part of population in northern parts of the region. Count Imre Csáky settled Hungarians in his possessions in Bačka in 1712. In 1745, Hungarian colonists settled in Senta, in 1750 in Topola, in 1752 in Doroslovo, in 1772 in Bogojevo, in 1760 in Stara Kanjiža, in 1764 in Iđoš, in 1767 in Petrovo Selo, in 1776 in Martonoš, in 1786 in Pačir and Ostojićevo, in 1787 in Piroš, and in 1789 in Feketić. Between 1782 and 1786, Hungarians settled in Crvenka and Stara Moravica, and in 1794 in Kula. Between 1751 and 1753, Hungarians settled in Mol and Ada (Those originated mostly from Szeged and Jászság). In 1764–1767, Hungarians settled in Subotica, Bajmok and Čantavir, and in 1770 again in Kanjiža, Mol, Ada and Petrovo Selo, as well as in Feldvarac, Sentomaš and Turija. In Banat, the settling of Hungarians started later. In 1784 Hungarians settled in Padej and Nakovo, in 1776 in Torda, in 1786 in Donji Itebej, in 1796 in Beodra and Čoka, in 1782 in Monoštor, in 1798 in Mađarska Crnja, in 1773 in Krstur and Majdan, in 1774 in Debeljača, in 1755–1760 in Bečkerek, and in 1766 in Vršac. In the 19th century, the Hungarian colonization increased. From the beginning of the century, the Hungarian individuals and small groups of settlers from Alföld constantly immigrating to Bačka. In the first half of the 19th century larger and smaller groups of the colonists settled in Mol (in 1805), as well as in Feldvarac, Temerin and Novi Sad (in 1806). In 1884, Hungarian colonists settled in Šajkaška and in Mali Stapar near Sombor. In 1889, Hungarians were settled in Svilojevo near Apatin and in 1892 in Gomboš, while another group settled in Gomboš in 1898. Many Hungarian settlers from Gomboš moved to Bačka Palanka. After the abolishment of the Military Frontier, Hungarian colonists were settled in Potisje, Čurug, Žabalj, Šajkaški Sveti Ivan, Titel and Mošorin. In 1883 around 1,000 Székely Hungarians settled in Kula, Stara Kanjiža, Stari Bečej and Titel. In 1800, smaller groups of Hungarian colonists from Dunántúl settled in Čoka, while in the same time colonists from Csanád and Csongrád counties settled in area around Itebej and Crnja, where they at first lived in scattered small settlements, and later they formed one single settlement - Mađarska Crnja. In 1824, one group of colonists from Čestereg also settled in Mađarska Crnja. In 1829 Hungarians settled in Mokrin, and in 1880 an even larger number of Hungarians settled in this municipality. In 1804, Hungarian colonists from Csongrád county settled in Firiđhaza (which was then joined with Turska Kanjiža), as well as in Sajan and Torda. Even a larger group of Hungarians from Csongrád settled in 1804 in Debeljača. In 1817–1818 Hungarians settled in Veliki Bikač, and in 1820–1840 smaller groups of Hungarians settled in Vranjevo. In 1826, colonists from Jászság and Kunság settled in Arač near Beodra. In 1830, Hungarians from Alföld settled in Veliki Lec, in 1831 in Ostojićevo, in 1832 in Malenčino Selo near Veliki Gaj, in 1839 and 1870 in Padej, in 1840 in Jermenovci and Mađarski Sentmihalj, in 1840–1841 in Dušanovac, in 1841 in Hetin, in 1859 in Sanad, in 1869 in Đurđevo (later moved to Skorenovac), and in 1890 in Gornja Mužlja. In 1883–1886, Székely Hungarians from Bukovina were settled in Vojlovica, Skorenovac, Ivanovo and Đurđevo. Total number of Székely colonists was 3,520.

The first Hungarian settlers in Syrmia moved there during the 1860s from neighbouring counties, especially from Bačka.

Hungarians of Roman Catholic faith originated mostly from Dunántúl, while Hungarians of Protestant faith originated mostly from Alföld.

Economy 

A mutual trade plays an important role in the economy of both countries. In 2015, Serbia was the 18th most important trading partner of Hungary. Serbia was among the most important countries for Hungary (export: the 18th place, import: the 26th place).

Most important Hungarian investors in Serbia: OTP Bank, MOL and Masterplast.

Resident diplomatic missions
 Hungary has an embassy in Belgrade (Belgrád) and a general consulate in Subotica (Szabadka). Ambassador of Hungary in Serbia is dr. Attila Pintér as of 22 November 2021.
 Serbia has an embassy in Budapest (Будимпешта) and an honorary consulate in Szeged (Сегедин). Ambassador of Serbia, in Hungary is dr. Ivan Todorov as of 22 November 2021.

See also
 Foreign relations of Hungary
 Foreign relations of Serbia 
 Hungary–Yugoslavia relations
 Hungarians in Serbia
 Serbs in Hungary

References and notes

Notes

References

Sources

External links
 Hungarian embassy in Belgrade 
  Hungarian general consulate in Subotica(in Hungarian and Serbian only) 
  Serbian Ministry of Foreign Affairs about relations with Hungary
  Serbian embassy in Budapest (in Hungarian and Serbian only)

 

 
Serbia
Bilateral relations of Serbia